The Synagogue du Quai Kléber (also formerly known as Neue Synagoge, "New Synagogue") was the main synagogue of Strasbourg, France before World War II. It was built in the "Neustadt" when the city was part of the German Empire (until 1918) and destroyed  by Nazi Germany after it annexed the city in 1940; in the years between, Strasbourg and its Jewish community were French.

History

The synagogue was designed by Ludwig Levy (1854–1907) and built from 1895 until 1898 at a final cost of 800,000 Reichsmark. The imposing Romanesque Revival building was inspired by the Imperial Cathedrals of Mainz, Speyer, and Worms, all located in the Rhine region, like Strasbourg.

The synagogue was built in pink and grey Vosges sandstone from the Phalsbourg quarries and crowned with a  dome, which rivalled the neighbouring Saint-Pierre-le-Jeune Catholic Church. A lateral oratory that was used on working days could accommodate 100 people.

After the 1940 victory over France, the Nazis annexed Alsace. The synagogue was first entirely plundered, then burnt to the ground. The destruction by arson was the work of a group of Hitler Youths from Baden and Alsace and occurred during the night from 30 September to 1 October 1940; a first deliberate fire had already been lit on 12 September. What remained of the walls was totally razed in 1941.

A first memorial to the synagogue was inaugurated in 1976 near the place where it once stood. That memorial was expanded in 1994, and the tramway station nearby was given the name Ancienne Synagogue Les Halles In 2012, the perimeter of the memorial was expanded again to include a newly created Allée des Justes-parmi-les-Nations dedicated to the Righteous Among the Nations. The 1994 memorial was  knocked down by a car in March 2019 in what was first suspected to be a deliberate act but was later ruled to be an accident; it has been restored since.

Gallery

References

External links 
La Synagogue Consistoriale du quai Kléber De la pose de la première pierre à sa destruction (1896-1940) 
La Synagogue du quai Kléber un livre de Jean Daltroff 
Ancienne Synagogue - 2 Quai Kléber 

Buildings and structures in Strasbourg
Religion in Strasbourg
Synagogues in Germany
Synagogues in France
Romanesque Revival synagogues
1898 architecture
Synagogues destroyed by Nazi Germany
Vandalized works of art
Buildings and structures demolished in 1940
Synagogues completed in 1898